Steil is a surname. Notable people with the surname include:

Benn Steil, American economist
Bryan Steil (born 1981), American politician
David J. Steil (born 1942), American politician
Fiona Steil-Antoni (born 1989), Luxembourg chess player
George Henry Steil Sr. (1861–1926), American politician
Jennifer Steil (born 1968), American author and journalist
Marie Henriette Steil (1898–1930), Luxembourg writer and feminist